Richard Sexton is a fine art and media photographer, author, teacher, and critic of the urban built environment with a studio based in New Orleans, Louisiana. He is best known for his architectural photography publications and exhibitions, which have been shown internationally. Sexton was born in 1954 in Atlanta, GA, and currently resides in both New Orleans, Louisiana, and Walton County, Florida.

Career 

Sexton began photographing as an undergraduate at Emory University. After graduating from Emory in 1975, he moved to San Francisco and enrolled in classes at the San Francisco Art Institute.
Sexton's first photographic book project, American Style: Classic Product Design from Airstream to Zippo, was published by Chronicle Books in 1987. Sexton's second book The Cottage Book, which documented the tradition of cottage living in the San Francisco Bay area, cemented book projects as a mainstay of his career. He was featured in a 1989 New York Times article on the expanding cottage architecture trend. Collaborating with architectural historian Randolph Delehanty, Sexton also authored In the Victorian Style, showcasing San Francisco's domestic Victorian architecture.

Sexton moved to New Orleans, Louisiana, in 1991, where he worked with Delehanty on New Orleans: Elegance and Decadence, a photo essay with extended captions characterizing New Orleans’ rich history. The book has remained consistently in print since its first publishing.
In 1997, Sexton curated the exhibit Sidney Bechet: A World of Jazz 1897-1997 for the Bechet Centennial Committee, which commemorated the centennial of jazz musician Sidney Bechet's birth.

Sexton's Terra Incognita monograph of Gulf Coast landscapes received critical acclaim, including a 2008 award from Louisiana Cultural Vistas magazine and a review in the Village Voice. Terra Incognita is accompanied by a traveling exhibit, which has been displayed at the Ogden Museum of Southern Art, the Walter Anderson Museum of Art, the Polk Museum of Art, the Southeast Museum of Photography, and the Pensacola Museum of Art.

Additionally, Sexton's book New Roads and Old Rivers was named "The New Must-Have Coffee Table Book" in August 2012 by Southern Living's The Daily South blog.

In February 2014, Sexton published his twelfth book, Creole World: Photographs of New Orleans and the Latin Caribbean Sphere. The book received favorable reviews in the Times-Picayune, Advocate and the Monroe, La. News-Star newspapers, as well as in Garden & Gun magazine's Daily Shot blog.

In August 2014, the New York Review of Books and the Wall Street Journal reviewed Creole World, noting the architectural and cultural similarities between the cities of New Orleans, Cartagena, Quito, Cap-Haitien and others. Creole World also reached viewers as an exhibit shown at the Historic New Orleans Collection before traveling to museums in Miami, Florida, and Shreveport, and Lafayette, Louisiana.

Sexton's latest project is Enigmatic Stream: Industrial Landscapes of the Lower Mississippi River, a book photographed and authored by Sexton with essays by Paul Schneider and John H. Lawrence. The Leica Store Miami previewed the corresponding exhibit in 2018, and the complete exhibit will open at the Historic New Orleans Collection on September 17, 2019 and remain open until April 5, 2020. The project examines a southern region of the Mississippi River that has been transformed by industries integrated into its locals' daily lives.

Sexton's photographs are included in the collections at the Historic New Orleans Collection, the New Orleans Museum of Art, the Ogden Museum of Southern Art, the Polk Museum of Art, the LSU Museum of Art in the Shaw Center for the Arts, Frost Art Museum, Pensacola Museum of Art, Southeast Museum of Photography, and numerous private collections. His work has been frequently exhibited in the U.S. and published in Europe. Sexton's work has appeared in such publications as Archetype, Abitare, Harper's, Louisiana Cultural Vistas, Smithsonian magazine, Photographer's Forum, Preservation magazine, Southern Accents magazine, and View Camera.

In addition to his publishing career, Sexton formerly taught photography at the New Orleans Academy of Fine Arts and at the Academy of Art College in San Francisco. Sexton also conducts independent workshops. He has conducted many workshops in New Orleans and held a destination workshop in Ireland in 2018. He lectures frequently at conferences and events around the U.S.

Awards 

 Overall Excellence Award from the Southeast Library Association, for Creole World: Photographs of New Orleans and the Latin Caribbean Sphere, by Richard Sexton, with essays by Jay D. Edwards and John H. Lawrence, 2016
Michael P. Smith Award for Documentary Photography, Louisiana Endowment for the Humanities, Feb. 2014
 Joseph Arrigo Book of the Year Award, New Orleans-Gulf South Booksellers Association, for Gardens of New Orleans: Exquisite Excess, by Lake Douglas and Jeannette Hardy, with photographs by Richard Sexton, 2001
 "50 People to Watch," New Orleans Magazine and WWL radio, New Orleans, LA 1994
 Award of Merit for New Orleans: Elegance and Decadence, Rounce & Coffin Club, Los Angeles, CA 1994

Books 

 American Style: Classic Product Design from Airstream to Zippo (1987)
 The Cottage Book (1989)
 In the Victorian Style, with Randolph Delehanty (1991)
 New Orleans: Elegance and Decadence, with Randolph Delehanty (1993)
 Parallel Utopias: The Quest for Community, with contributing essays by William Turnbull, Jr. and Ray Oldenburg (1995)
 Vestiges of Grandeur: The Plantations of Louisiana's River Road (1999)
 Gardens of New Orleans: Exquisite Excess (2000)
 Rosemary Beach (2007)
 Terra Incognita: Photographs of America's Third Coast (2007)
 Destrehan: The Man, The House, The Legacy (2008)
 New Roads and Old Rivers: Louisiana's Historic Pointe Coupee Parish (2012)
Creole World: Photographs of New Orleans and the Latin Caribbean Sphere (2014)
Enigmatic Stream: Industrial Landscapes of the Lower Mississippi River (2018)

Solo exhibitions 

The Highway of Temptation and Redemption: A Gothic Travelogue in Two Dimensions: The Ogden Museum of Southern Art, New Orleans
Terra Incognita: Photographs of America's Third Coast: The Ogden Museum of Southern Art, New Orleans; WaterColor, Santa Rosa Beach, FL; Walter Anderson Museum, Ocean Springs, MS; South Arkansas Arts Center, El Dorado, AR; Polk Museum of Art, Lakeland, FL; Pensacola Museum of Art, Pensacola, FL; Southeast Museum of Photography, Daytona Beach, FL
Languid Moments: Charleston, New Orleans, Havana: Rebekah Jacob Gallery, New Orleans, LA
Creole World: Photographs of New Orleans and the Latin Caribbean Sphere: The Historic New Orleans Collection, New Orleans; Frost Art Museum, Miami; Meadows Museum of Art, Shreveport, LA; Hilliard Museum, Lafayette, LA
Richard Sexton: Louisiana: A Gallery for Fine Photography, New Orleans, LA

References

External links 
 

1954 births
Living people
Photographers from Louisiana
20th-century American photographers
21st-century American photographers
Emory University alumni
San Francisco Art Institute alumni